Hummus ('chickpeas'; full Arabic name: ḥummuṣ bi-ṭ-ṭaḥīna , 'chickpeas with tahini'), also spelled hommus or houmous, is a Middle Eastern dip, spread, or savory dish made from cooked, mashed chickpeas blended with tahini, lemon juice, and garlic. The standard garnish in the Middle East includes olive oil, a few whole chickpeas, parsley, and paprika.

In Middle Eastern cuisine, it is usually eaten as a dip, with pita bread. In the West, it is now produced industrially, and is often served as a snack or appetizer with crackers.

Etymology and spelling
The word hummus comes from  'chickpeas'. The full name of the prepared spread in Arabic is  'chickpeas with tahini'. Some claim that it was mentioned in the Hebrew Bible, in the book of Ruth as hometz, which can be derived from the word himtza for chickpeas.

Spelling of the word in English can be inconsistent, though most major dictionaries from American and British publishers give hummus as the primary spelling. Some American dictionaries give hommos as an alternative, while British dictionaries give houmous or hoummos.

The major British supermarkets use houmous.

Other spellings include homous, houmos, houmus, and similar variants. While humus (as it is spelled in Turkish) is sometimes found, it is avoided as a heteronym of humus, organic matter in soil.

Origin and history
Although multiple different theories and claims of origins exist in various parts of the Middle East, evidence is insufficient to determine the precise location or time of the invention of hummus. Its basic ingredients—chickpeas, sesame, lemon, and garlic—have been combined and eaten in Egypt and the Levant for centuries. Though regional populations widely ate chickpeas, and often cooked them in stews and other hot dishes, puréed chickpeas eaten cold with tahini do not appear in records before the Abbasid period in Egypt and the Levant.

The earliest known written recipes for a dish resembling hummus bi tahina are recorded in cookbooks written in Cairo in the 13th century. A cold purée of chickpeas with vinegar and pickled lemons with herbs, spices, and oil, but no tahini or garlic, appears in the Kanz al-Fawa'id fi Tanwi' al-Mawa'id; and a purée of chickpeas and tahini called hummus kasa appears in the Kitab Wasf al-Atima al-Mutada: it is based on puréed chickpeas and tahini, and acidulated with vinegar (though not lemon), but it also contains many spices, herbs, and nuts, and no garlic. It is also served by rolling it out and letting it sit overnight.

Regional preparations

As an appetizer and dip, diners scoop hummus with flatbread, such as pita. It is also served as part of a meze or as an accompaniment to falafel, grilled chicken, fish, or eggplant.

Hummus is a popular dip in Egypt where it is eaten with pita, and frequently flavored with cumin or other spices.

In the Levant, hummus has long been a staple food, often served as a warm dish, with bread for breakfast, lunch or dinner. All of the ingredients in hummus are easily found in gardens, farms and markets, thus adding to the availability and popularity of the dish. Hummus is usually garnished, with olive oil, "nana" mint leaves, paprika, and parsley.

Hummus is a common part of everyday meals in Israel. It is made from ingredients that, following Kashrut (Jewish dietary laws), can be combined with both meat and dairy meals. Chickpea dishes have long been part of the cuisine of Jews who lived in the Middle East and Northern Africa. The many Mizrahi Jewish immigrants from these countries brought their own unique variations, such as hummus with fried eggplant and boiled eggs prepared by Iraqi Jews. For example, the Yemenite quarter of Tel Aviv is known for its hummus with traditional skhug hot sauce. Israeli versions use large amounts of tahini for a creamier texture. According to Peli-Bronshtein "Israelis also added a hard-boiled egg next to the hummus. And the large quantities of tahini that are part of the hummus these days also are an Israeli thing." Many restaurants, called hummusia, run by Mizrahi Jews and Arabs are dedicated to warm hummus. Those restaurants are largely "male territory". It may be served as chick peas softened with baking soda along with garlic, olive oil, cumin and tahini. One of the hummus versions available is msabbaha, made with lemon-spiked tahini garnished with whole chick peas, a sprinkling of paprika and a drizzle of olive oil. Other versions, includes the foul, made with stewed fava beans, the pitryot made with mushrooms or the Jerusalem made with spiced ground beef and pine nuts. 

One author calls hummus, "One of the most popular and best-known of all Syrian dishes" and a "must on any mezzeh table." Syrian and Lebanese in Canada's Arab diaspora prepare and consume hummus along with other dishes like falafel, kibbeh and tabbouleh, even among the third- and fourth-generation offspring of the original immigrants.

In Cyprus, hummus is part of the local cuisine in both Turkish Cypriot and Greek Cypriot communities where it is called "humoi". In the United Kingdom, hummus was popularized by Greek Cypriot caterers, sometimes leading to a perception of it being a Greek food.

In Turkey, hummus is considered a meze.

In the United States and Europe, hummus is commercially available in numerous traditional and non-traditional varieties, such as beet or chocolate.

Nutrition
Chickpeas, the main ingredient of conventional hummus, have appreciable amounts of dietary fiber, protein, vitamin B6, manganese and other nutrients.

As hummus recipes vary, so does nutritional content, depending primarily on the relative proportions of chickpeas, tahini, and water. Hummus provides roughly 170 calories for 100 grams, and is a good to excellent (more than 10% of the Daily Value) source of dietary fiber, vitamin B6, and several dietary minerals.

Fat content, mostly from tahini and olive oil, is about 14% of the total; other major components are 65% water, 17% total carbohydrates, including a small amount of sugar, and about 10% protein.

Packaged product

United States
In 2006, hummus was present in 12 percent of American households, rising to 17 percent by early 2009. One commentator attributed the growth of hummus to America's embrace of ethnic and exotic foods.

While in 2006–08 when some 15 million Americans consumed hummus, and annual national sales were about $5 million, sales growth in 2016 was reflected by an estimated 25% of US households consuming hummus. By 2016, the leading American hummus manufacturer, Sabra Dipping Company, held a 62% market share for hummus sales in the United States, and was forecast to exceed $1 billion in sales in 2017. 

Hummus consumption has been so popular that many tobacco farmers have switched to growing chickpeas to meet demand.

United Kingdom 
In the 1980s, the supermarket Waitrose was the first British supermarket to stock hummus. Hummus was popularized in the UK by chefs such as Yotam Ottolenghi, Claudia Roden and Anissa Helou. As of 2013, £60 million worth of hummus was sold in the UK each year, and one survey found that 41% of Britons had hummus in their fridge, twice as many as the rest of Europe. A Waitrose spokesperson said it had become a grocery staple.

Popular culture
Hummus is often seen as an unofficial "national dish" of Israel, reflecting its huge popularity and significance among the entire Israeli population, which Israel's critics describe as an appropriation of Lebanese, Palestinian or Arab culture. According to Ofra Tene and Dafna Hirsch, the dispute over ownership of hummus, exposes nationalism through food and the important role played by the industrialization of hummus made by Israeli private companies in 1958. Although, hummus has traditionally been part of the cuisine of the Mizrahi Jews who lived in Arabic-speaking lands, the dish was also popularized among the Jewish immigrants from Europe in the late 19th and early 20th century. Historian Dafna Hirsch describes its adoption in their diet as part of an attempt of blending in the Middle Eastern environment, while sociologist Rafi Grosglick points out the importance of its health aspects to their diet. In recent years, through a process of gourmetization, the Arab identity of hummus became a marker of its authenticity, making famous Arab-Israeli villages such as Abu Gosh and Kafr Yasif. Hence, enthusiasts travel to the more remote Arab and Druze villages in the northern Galilee region in search of culinary experiences.

In October 2008, the Association of Lebanese Industrialists petitioned to the Lebanese Ministry of Economy and Trade to request protected status from the European Commission for hummus as a uniquely Lebanese food, similar to the Protected Geographical Status rights held over regional food items by various European Union countries. , the Lebanese Industrialists Association was still "collecting documents and proof" to support its claim.

The 2005 short film West Bank Story features a rivalry between two fictional restaurants, the Israeli "Kosher King" and the Palestinian "Hummus Hut". A parody of West Side Story, the film won the 2006 Academy Award for Best Live Action Short Film. In 2012, Australian filmmaker Trevor Graham released a documentary, Make Hummus Not War, on the political and gastronomic aspects of hummus.

Lebanon and Israel's chefs have been engaged in a competition over the largest dish of hummus, as validated by the Guinness World Record, as a form of contestation of "ownership". The "title" has gone back and forth between Israel (2008), Lebanon (2009), Israel (January 2010), and, Lebanon (May 2010).

See also

 
 List of dips
 List of hors d'oeuvre
 List of legume dishes

References

Bibliography

External links

 Anny Gaul, "Translating Hummus", Cooking with Gaul, October 21, 2019. On hummus variants and authenticity.

 
appetizers
Arab cuisine
chickpea dishes
dips (food)
Egyptian cuisine
Levantine cuisine 
national dishes
spreads (food)
legume dishes